The Men's 15 kilometre freestyle event of the FIS Nordic World Ski Championships 2015 was held on 25 February 2015. A 10 km qualification race was held on 18 February.

Results

Race
The race was started at 13:30.

Qualification
The race was held at 15:00.

References

Men's 15 kilometre freestyle